Sergey Ponomaryov (born 15 April 1998) is a Kazakhstani cyclist. He competed in the men's sprint event at the 2020 Summer Olympics. He also competed in three events at the 2020 UCI Track Cycling World Championships and in two events at the 2019 UCI Track Cycling World Championships.

References

External links
 

1998 births
Living people
Kazakhstani male cyclists
Olympic cyclists of Kazakhstan
Cyclists at the 2020 Summer Olympics
Place of birth missing (living people)
Kazakhstani track cyclists
Cyclists at the 2018 Asian Games
Asian Games competitors for Kazakhstan
21st-century Kazakhstani people